The Bucieș is a left tributary of the river Cașin in Romania. It flows into the Cașin near Scutaru.

References

Rivers of Romania
Rivers of Bacău County